

Film Northants 2008 

Film Northants is a short film competition originally set up by the Northampton Chronicle & Echo in 2008. Each year people of any age living, working or studying in Northamptonshire are invited to send a film of no more than five minutes length to the competition. All the entries are placed on the internet on http://www.filmnorthants.co.uk

A panel of judges draw up a shortlist of eight finalists and the public are invited to vote for their favourite film via text and email.

All eight finalists have their films screened at Vue Cinema in Sol Central Northampton at a special red carpet awards night.

The winning film in 2008 was made by Northampton College students and was a horror flick titled Confined.

The 2008 judges were: Tim Coley, film lecturer, The University of Northampton; John Tredrea, manager, Vue Cinema Northampton; Lily Canter, features editor, Northampton Chronicle & Echo

The competition was invented, organised and hosted by Lily Canter. It now runs as an independent not-for-profit film festival with a committee of community volunteers.

Film Northants 2009 

After the success of the first competition, Film Northants 2009 was launched in March.  The 2009 event was supported by Vue Cinema, Aspect Ratio Productions, Heart, Reelscape Films, The University of Northampton, The Film Lab, 20th Century Fox and London Midland train line.

The shortlist of eight films were selected by a panel of judges and the public were invited to vote via text or online through the Northampton Chronicle & Echo.  The selected films were shown at a red carpet screening at Vue Cinema in Northampton on 22 September 2009 and the awards were announced on the night.

Winner - Public Vote 

No Stone Unturned by Anthony Dumont & Matthew Dumont

A history student follows a trail of clues to help put a spirit to rest.

Winner - Judges Choice Award 

''Tuhfah by Stacey SwiftA witty story with a political message which explores child exploitation in Asia.

 Second Place If Only I Could by Sharmila WaltersA young boy dreams of winning a creative writing competition.

 Third Place Death by Deafness'' by Alex Nowak and Jack Hunt

A bullied deaf girl struggles to cope with her disability which ultimately leads to a personal tragedy.

Film Northants 2010

Film Northants is now an independent organisation and will be running a festival in conjunction with Cineworld, Northampton in September 2010. A new website has also been launched: http://www.filmnorthants.co.uk

Film Northants 2014 

This was the first year that the Film Northants awards night took place at the Errol Flynn Filmhouse at Derngate, Northampton. The event was split over two nights with the Under 16's award taking place on the first night.

Under 16 Winner

Dimension Dilemma by Bridgewater Primary School Film Club 
A mischievous short made by pupils from Bridgewater Primary School.

Judge's Choice Winner

Beneath the Wormwood Trees by Dope Meat Films 
A traveller has to make a choice - find a way to break the curse that haunts him, or sacrifice everything he has ever loved beneath the wormwood trees. A visceral short film by University of Northampton graduates Joe Burden and Alex Powell.

Winner - Public Vote

Villainy by Chris Saunders 
Being a supervillain runs in the blood - it's the family trade, after all. But what happens when you're not very good at it? A short comedy film about, well, villainy.

Film Northants 2015 

Another successful year coming from the under and over 16 categories. The event was supported by Errol Flynn and Reelscape Films.

Under 16 Winner

The New Kid by Kamil Targonski 
'The New Kid' follows the story of Jason, a new student starting a new school. The situation gets worse when James starts mocking him every day, in school and through the use of social media. This film shows how bullying can be dealt with.

Judges Choice Winner

Clear Sky by Chris Cosentino 
An animated short for Film Northants 2015 about a boy and a girl. Then some stuff with moon happens. Then it's happy. And then the ending happens.

Winner - Public Vote

Sprite by Andrew Griffin 
A young girl witnesses a killer burying his victim, with unforeseen consequences.

References
https://web.archive.org/web/20090215183938/http://www.northamptonchron.co.uk/sectionhome.aspx?sectionID=12771
https://web.archive.org/web/20081202214905/http://www.holdthefrontpage.co.uk/news/080724chronfilm.shtml
https://uonmedia.co.uk/uon-film-makers-win-top-prize-at-film-festival/
https://www.northamptonchron.co.uk/news/witchcraft-villainy-and-mischief-the-winners-at-northampton-film-awards-ceremony-1-6275896
http://www.filmnorthants.co.uk/2015-winners/
https://www.imdb.com/title/tt5159770/?ref_=nm_flmg_dr_2
https://vimeo.com/108138443

Film competitions